Danielle Leige Paz (born 18 May 1994) is an Israeli footballer who plays as a forward and has appeared for the Israel women's national team.

Career
Paz has been capped for the Israel national team, appearing for the team during the 2019 FIFA Women's World Cup qualifying cycle.

References

External links
 
 
 

1994 births
Living people
Israeli women's footballers
Israel women's international footballers
Women's association football forwards
Israeli Jews